Laurent Keller (born 28 February 1961) is a Swiss evolutionary biologist, myrmecologist and author. He was a professor at the University of Lausanne from 1996 to 2023.

Life, studies and career 

Born and raised in the French-speaking part of Switzerland, he accomplished his studies in biology at the University of Lausanne (bachelor, master and doctoral degrees), after which he was a research associate at the Laboratory of Entomology of the University Paul-Sabatier (in Toulouse, France), a post-doctoral fellow at the University of Lausanne, a post-doctoral research associate at the Museum of Comparative Zoology at Harvard University, and again a post-doctoral research associate at the University of Lausanne.

Subsequently, he was nominated Associate Professor of Ecology at the University of Lausanne in 1996, where he later became head of the Institute of Ecology (1998), and was then promoted to Full Professor of Evolutionary Ecology and head of the Department of Ecology and Evolution (in 2000), positions held until leaving the University of Lausanne in 2023, for unknown reasons.

In August 2013, he was elected president of the European Society for Evolutionary Biology and served in that office from 2015 to 2017

For a time he served as a member of the Editorial Board for Current Biology.

Research 
Laurent Keller has contributed to the study of the evolution of eusociality in ants with numerous scientific publications in peer-reviewed journals, invited talks and seminars, and appearances in the media (press, radio, and television).

His research group is aiming to "understand the principles governing the evolution of animal societies and the ecological and evolutionary consequences of social life". (Group Keller at the University of Lausanne) Disciplines in which members of his research group are active include animal behaviour, ecology, evolutionary genetics, and genomics.

Teaching 
He taught "Evolution", "Evolutionary mechanisms (advanced course)" and "Experimental design" at the School of Biology of the Faculty of Biology and Medicine of the University of Lausanne on a regular basis.

Contributions 
His contributions include over 180 scientific articles in peer-reviewed journals, book chapters in scientific textbooks, and three books such as:
 Le monde des fourmis. 2006. L. Keller & E. Gordon, Odile Jacob, Paris, 303 pp.
 Levels of Selection in Evolution. 1999. L. Keller (ed.), Princeton University Press, Princeton, 318 pp.
 Queen Number and Sociality in Insects. 1993. L. Keller (ed.), Oxford University Press, Oxford, 439 pp.

See also 
 Myrmecology
 Eusociality
 Ants
 Entomology
 Evolution
 Ecology

References

External links 
 
 Ant genomics base database developed by Keller group members in collaboration with Swiss Institute of Bioinformatics 
 Keller Research Group at the Department of Ecology and Evolution of the University of Lausanne.
 Department of Ecology and Evolution, University of Lausanne.
 School of Biology of the Faculty of Biology and Medicine, University of Lausanne.
 Faculty of Biology and Medicine, University of Lausanne.
 University of Lausanne, Switzerland.

Swiss biologists
Evolutionary biologists
Myrmecologists
University of Lausanne alumni
Academic staff of the University of Lausanne
Harvard University staff
1961 births
Living people